The Hanoi Buffaloes are a Vietnamese professional basketball team based in Hanoi, Vietnam. Hanoi Buffaloes represents Hanoi, the capital city of Vietnam, play in the Vietnam Basketball Association.

Season-by-season record

Current roster

References

Basketball teams established in 2016
Basketball teams in Vietnam
Vietnam Basketball Association teams
2016 establishments in Vietnam